Archibald Archer M.L.A., J.P., (18 March 1820 – 6 February 1902) 
was a Queensland politician, a Member of the Queensland Legislative Assembly, and  Treasurer of Queensland. He was one of the Archer brothers, an early Queensland pioneering family.

Personal life
Archibald Archer was born in Fife, Scotland on 18 March 1820, the son of William Archer, of Larvik, Norway. At age 5, Archer went with his father to Norway and was educated in Norway. Later he spent five years in an engineering establishment in Scotland. Archer emigrated to Australia, where he arrived in 1842, but only stayed five months, subsequently spending thirteen years in the South Sea and Sandwich Islands. In the latter he was engaged on coffee and sugar plantations.

Returning to Queensland in 1860, Archer took up his residence at Gracemere station.

In 1896, Archer left Australia and died at the family's Norwegian estate, Tolderedden, Larvik, Norway on 6 February 1902 aged 81 years.

Public life

Archer was elected to the Legislative Assembly of Queensland as the member for Rockhampton from 27 July 1867 to 19 November 1869, during which he assisted in passing the Land Act of 1868.

On 28 November 1878, Archer was elected again to the Legislative Assembly of Queensland as the member for Blackall which he held until 23 January 1886.  During this term, he was Treasurer and Secretary for Public Instruction in the first Thomas McIlwraith Government from 5 January 1882 to 13 November 1883.

On 5 May 1888, Archer was elected again to the Legislative Assembly of Queensland as the member for Rockhampton (again) which he held until 4 April 1896. Archer was a strong advocate of the subdivision of Queensland. In 1892 Mr. Archer visited England in company with John Ferguson as a deputation on behalf of the Central Queensland Territorial Separation League.

See also
The Archer brothers

References

1820 births
1902 deaths
Members of the Queensland Legislative Assembly
People from Fife
Treasurers of Queensland
19th-century Australian politicians